Bezidek Hill is a summit in Washington County the U.S. state of Missouri. The summit is in a mined area one half mile east of Shibboleth and Missouri Route E.

Bezidek Hill has the name of a businessperson in the local lead-mining industry.

References

Landforms of Washington County, Missouri
Hills of Missouri